Cowan Bog Ecological Reserve is an ecological reserve located northeast of the Duck Mountain Provincial Forest, Manitoba, Canada. It was established in 1983 under the Manitoba Ecological Reserves Act.

See also
 List of ecological reserves in Manitoba
 List of protected areas of Manitoba

References

External links
 iNaturalist: Cowan Bog Ecological Reserve

Protected areas established in 1983
Ecological reserves of Manitoba
Nature reserves in Manitoba
Protected areas of Manitoba